is a Japanese manga series written and illustrated by Hiroyuki Takei. It was serialized in Shueisha's Weekly Shōnen Jump from March to August 1997, with its chapters collected in three tankōbon volumes. "Buddha Zone" is the concept by which a Buddha can appear on Earth using a Buddha statue.

The series highlights the adventures of Senju (the Thousand-Hand Avalokiteśvara Bodhisattva) who has to find and protect Sachi, an incarnation of the Buddha Miroku (Maitreya Bodhisattva). Miroku is said to appear on Earth at a time when the Dharma is no longer taught and is completely forgotten, achieve complete enlightenment and then re-teach the pure dharma, becoming a successor of Śākyamuni Buddha, the founder of Buddhism. It is thus Senju's job to aid Miroku (Sachi) in achieving enlightenment, enabling her to achieve Buddha.

Description
In 1975,a young orphan girl named Sachi protests against the planned destruction of the temple Saigan (her home) by the Minoura clan, who plans to build a hotel in its place.  When one of the gangsters notices the statue of the Thousand-Hand Kannon within the temple, Sachi tells them that she will not allow anything to happen to the statue.  In response, the gangsters laugh and threaten her, telling her that there is nothing the statue can do to save her.  However, the Thousand-Hand Kannon comes to life, breaking the temple doors and attacking one of the gangsters.  The statue shatters into pieces and inside it is a boy who tells them to lay their hands off Sachi, sending fear amongst the gangsters who then flee, vowing revenge. The boy introduces himself as Senju, the Thousand-Hand Kannon.

Senju, as an emissary of the buddha Kannon, has appeared in the human world to find and protect the reincarnation of the future Buddha, Miroku.  Recognizing Sachi as Miroku, Senju reveals that it is his mission to accompany her to India where she will awaken and achieve enlightenment to save the world from destruction.  However, they are inhibited by the Mara, forces that seek to pollute with earthly desires, and Buddha who believe that Senju is not strong enough to protect Sachi from harm.

Characters
 
Senju, known as the Thousand-Hand Avalokiteśvara, is a Bodhisattva sent to protect the incarnation of the bodhisattva Miroku by Dainichi Nyorai (Mahavairocana). Because his original statue was made of wood, Senju can float.

A young girl who was abandoned by her parents 10 years before the beginning of the story and raised by a poor priest. Sachi is an incarnation of the Buddha Miroku. She is initially suspicious towards Senju, but eventually follows him to avoid being attacked constantly by the envoys of Mara.

(The Bodhisattva Ksitigarbha) Senju's childhood friend. He had waited for 2500 years for Miroku's appearance.

The leader of the Minoura clan, Minoura destroyed Sachi's temple, but was defeated by Senju. He and his clan later become Buddhist monks and help rebuild the temple. The origin of the character name is American comic book artist and writer Mike Mignola.

The main antagonist. A former Bodhisattva who went towards Mara. He is the leader of the forces opposing the awakening of Miroku. He was once friends with Senju.

A stone lion/dog looking statue who originally posed next to a temple, he was rescued by Senju when he was thrown. He followed Senju onto Earth.

The Bodhisattva Hayagriva, he was sent to replace Senju when the situation becomes critical.

An itako priestess who possesses the ability to summon the dead using her body as a medium and wields the sword Harusame.  Found on Mount Osore, she was raised by an elderly itako, whom Anna views as a grandmother.  She has a cheerful and indomitable spirit, along with an unscrupulous desire to obtain money in order to travel the world and find her birth parents.  Her character later inspired Anna Kyoyama, one of the main characters of Takei's later work, Shaman King.

A wood carver and sculptor who created Senju's body. He modeled Senju's appearance based on that of his deceased sister, Osen. Senju and the other communicate with him using Anna as a medium.

Media

Manga
Butsu Zone is written and illustrated by Hiroyuki Takei. The manga was serialized in Weekly Shōnen Jump from March 3 to August 14, 1997. Shueisha collected the nineteen individual chapters known as "Butsu" into three tankōbon. The first was published on July 4, 1997; the final was released on December 4, 1997. Shueisha re-released the series in two volumes on July 18, 2007.

Volume list

Audio drama

References

External links

Buddhist comics
Hiroyuki Takei
Shōnen manga
Shueisha manga